Kosmos 104 ( meaning Cosmos 104) or Zenit-2 No.36 was a Soviet, first generation, low resolution, optical film-return reconnaissance satellite launched in 1966.

Kosmos 104 was launched by a Vostok-2 rocket flying from Site 31/6 at the Baikonur Cosmodrome. The launch took place at 08:24 GMT on 7 January 1966; however, program not completely met. Spacecraft put into incorrect orbit by abnormal function of second and third stages of booster. The spacecraft received a Kosmos designation, along with the International Designator 1966-001A and the Satellite Catalog Number 01903.

Despite the problem during its launch, Kosmos 104 was able to complete most of its imaging mission. On 15 January 1966, after eight days in orbit, the satellite was deorbited with its return capsule descending by parachute for a successful recovery by Soviet force.

References

Kosmos satellites
Partial satellite launch failures
Spacecraft launched in 1966
Spacecraft which reentered in 1966
Zenit-2 satellites
1966 in the Soviet Union